Karl Wahlmüller (22 October 1913 in Linz – 16 February 1944 in Toila, Soviet Union) was an Austrian footballer who competed in the 1936 Summer Olympics. He was part of the Austria national team, which won the silver medal in the football tournament. He played all four matches as midfielder.

He played for SV Urfahr Linz at the time of his Olympic appearance and latterly for LSV Adlerhorst Weis before his death.

He was killed in action serving on the Eastern Front in 1944 aged 30.

References

External links
 profile

1913 births
1944 deaths
Austrian footballers
Association football midfielders
Footballers at the 1936 Summer Olympics
Medalists at the 1936 Summer Olympics
Olympic footballers of Austria
Olympic silver medalists for Austria
Austria international footballers
Olympic medalists in football
Austrian military personnel killed in World War II